Kotli Sattian is a Tehsil (subdivision) of Murree District in the Punjab province of Pakistan. Its name is derived from the mountain town of Kotli and the Satti tribe. This subdivision is geographically a part of the Murree and Kahuta hills. It was declared a subdivision in 1990 by breaking up 40 villages out of both subdivisions. The people of Kotli Sattian are referred to as The historical and traditional royal tribe of this territory is the Janjuas.

Population
The population of the villages comprising Kotli Sattian town (tehsil) was 83,255 in 1981, while the 1998 census shows the figure at 81,524, a decrease of 0.12 percent. According to the census of 2017, the population is 119,312. The historical and traditional royal tribe of this territory is the Janjuas, others are Dhaniyals, Kethwal, Dhond Abbasi and Satti. Satti tribe is in majority as compare to other tribes living in Kotli Sattian.

Location
Kotli Sattian is a Tehsil of Murree district which is located in the Pir Panjal Range bordering with Kashmir. Before 1990, It was a part of Tehsil Murree. In establishing this tehsil, some areas of Kahuta tehsil were also included in it. It is 50 km away from Islamabad on the banks of Jehlum River. Most front areas of AJK are District. Bagh, Rawalakot and Pallandri. The Jehlum River separates Mallot Sattian, Badnian, Begal, Thoon and Chijana with Kashmir.

Gallery

References

Murree
Murree District
Tehsils of Punjab, Pakistan